David Murphy (born 1985) is a Gaelic footballer from County Laois.

He plays at wing forward for Laois and in 2003 was part of the Laois team that won the All-Ireland Minor Football Championship title for the first time since 1997. He scored a late equaliser in the drawn final against Dublin to secure a replay.

In 2006, Murphy was part of the Laois team that won the Leinster U21 Football Championship.

References

1985 births
Living people
Laois inter-county Gaelic footballers
Portarlington Gaelic footballers